Urciscenus was Bishop of Pavia, from around 183 until his death in 216. He is believed to have led the see of Pavia during a period of increased persecutions.

References

216 deaths
Italian Roman Catholic saints
3rd-century Italian bishops
Year of birth unknown